Eloise Webb (born 5 March 1996) is a South African rugby sevens player.

Biography 
Webb participated in cricket and javelin in the junior national levels. She also played in the Varsity Sports netball competition. She studied at the Nelson Mandela University for a Bachelor of Education degree in Intermediate Phase Teaching.

In 2018, Webb competed for South Africa in the Commonwealth Games in Gold Coast, Queensland. She later featured for South Africa at the Rugby World Cup Sevens in San Francisco. She scored a hat-trick in her international test debut for the Springbok Women against Uganda in the 2019 Rugby Africa Women's Cup.

Webb was named in South Africa's sevens squad for the 2022 seven's season and featured in the France Women's Sevens. She scored a try in the final of the 2022 Africa Women's Sevens and helped her side qualify for the Commonwealth Games in Birmingham.

Webb was selected for the South African squad for the 2022 Rugby World Cup Sevens in Cape Town. She was also named in South Africa's women's fifteens team for the Rugby World Cup in New Zealand.

References 

Living people
1996 births
Female rugby sevens players
South African female rugby union players
South Africa international women's rugby sevens players